Mitt i naturen is a Swedish nature show which has been broadcast on SVT since 1980. The show uses the song Chariots of Fire by Vangelis as its signature melody.

References

Sveriges Television original programming